With a Smile and a Song may refer to:

 With a Smile and a Song (album), a 1964 album featuring Doris Day
 "With a Smile and a Song" (song), a 1937 song by Frank Churchill and Larry Morey